Coleophora mirabibella is a moth of the family Coleophoridae. It is found in Namibia.

References

Moths described in 2011
mirabibella
Moths of Africa